The 1991 Men's African Volleyball Championship was in Cairo, Egypt, with 10 teams participating in the continental championship.

Teams

Final ranking

References
 Men Volleyball Africa Championship 1991 Cairo (EGY)

1991 Men
African championship, Men
Men's African Volleyball Championship
1991 in Egyptian sport
International volleyball competitions hosted by Egypt